Zeeboids is an avatar creation application developed by Zeebo Interactive Studios in Brazil and released exclusively for the Zeebo system. Zeeboids is compatible with Zeebo Football Club (F.C.) games such as Zeebo F.C. Foot Camp, enabling players to create custom characters ("avatars") and participate in online rankings.

Creating Zeeboids
Zeeboids has 24 options for customizing the look of the characters—including skin, physique, hairstyles and other features—and 12 different uniforms. It keeps track of and rewards avatar accomplishments, allows players to upload scores, take part in online rankings and use their avatars on each other's Zeebo systems.

Compatible games

Online Tournament in Brazil
From June 11, 2010, concurrent with the 2010 FIFA World Cup, Zeebo Brazil held an online tournament for players with Foot Camp and Zeeboids. The top scorers in each of the four mini-games, as well as those with the best overall combined scores, were awarded free Z-Credits.

See also
 Avatar
 Mii
 PlayStation Home

References

External links
 Official Brazilian Website (Brazilian Portuguese)
 Official Mexican Website (Spanish)
 Official Zeebo Inc. Blog Posts on Zeeboids (English)

Zeebo
Virtual avatars